Shiyun M. Smith (born October 26, 1998) is an American football wide receiver and punt returner for the Carolina Panthers of the National Football League (NFL). He played college football at South Carolina.

Early years
Smith attended Union County High School in Union County, South Carolina. He caught 54 passes for 1,337 yards and 17 touchdowns as a junior and  67 passes for 907 yards and 10 touchdowns as a senior. He committed to the University of South Carolina to play college football as a 4 star recruit.

College career
As a true freshman at South Carolina in 2017, Smith played in 12 games with seven starts and had 29 receptions for 409 yards and three touchdowns. He again started nine of 12 games in 2018, recording 45 receptions for 673 yards and four touchdowns. As a junior in 2019, he started all 10 games he played in missing two due to injury. He finished the season with 43 receptions for 489 yards and two touchdowns. Smith became South Carolina's primary receiving target his senior season in 2020. Smith finished his senior season in 2020 with 57 receptions for 633 yards and 4 touchdowns over the course of 9 games.

Following the conclusion of the 2020 season, Smith announced he was declaring for the 2021 NFL Draft.

Smith left South Carolina fourth in program history in total catches and eighth in receiving yards. He also is tied for 13th in the record books for career touchdowns.

Professional career
Smith ran a 4.43 40-yard dash, performed a 36 inch vertical jump, a 10 ft, 3 inch broad jump, and ran a 6.83 3-cone drill at his pro day.

Smith was selected by the Carolina Panthers with the 204th pick in the sixth round of the 2021 NFL Draft. On May 13, 2021, Smith signed his four-year rookie contract with Carolina. On December 11, 2022, Smith scored his first career touchdown against the Seattle Seahawks on a 13 yard pass from Sam Darnold.

Personal life
On March 25, 2022, Smith was arrested for unlawfully carrying a handgun, drug possession, and speeding in South Carolina.

References

External links
South Carolina Gamecocks bio

1998 births
Living people
Carolina Panthers players
People from Union County, South Carolina
Players of American football from South Carolina
American football wide receivers
South Carolina Gamecocks football players